Varesi is a surname. Notable people with the surname include:

 Fabian Varesi, Italian musician
 Felice Varesi (1813–1889), French-born Italian opera singer
 Gilda Varesi (1887–1965), Italian-born actress and playwright
 Valerio Varesi, Italian author